Arthur R. Wilkowski (December 29, 1928 – November 30, 1999) was a member of the Ohio House of Representatives. He died of heart failure in 1999.

References

1928 births
Democratic Party members of the Ohio House of Representatives
1999 deaths
20th-century American politicians